Ex YU rock enciklopedija 1960 - 2006 (trans. Ex YU Rock Encyclopedia 1960 - 2006) is a book by Serbian author, journalist and music critic Petar Janjatović. Published in 2007, the book represents the third, expanded edition of Janjatović's 1998 book Ilustrovana YU rock enciklopedija 1960 - 1997 (Illustrated YU Rock Encyclopedia 1960 - 1997). The book features information about most important acts of the rock scene of Socialist Federal Republic of Yugoslavia, as well as of scenes of the successor states.

Background
The book contains biographies and discographies of the most important acts of the Yugoslav rock scene, as well as of the scenes of the successor states. Besides rock acts in the traditional sense of the term, the book features blues, reggae, world music, hip hop, ambient and avant-garde music acts. The book also contains basic information about a large number of less notable acts, but incorporated into the articles about related notable acts. The book also features an appendix with the information about most notable Yugoslav rock music festivals and magazines.

Ilustrovana YU rock enciklopedija 1960 - 1997 (1998)
The first edition of the book, entitled Ilustrovana YU rock enciklopedija 1960 - 1997, was published in 1998. In the foreword, Janjatović states that, in the early 1980s, he and Dragan Kremer were offered to write the encyclopedia of Yugoslav rock, but that they declined, as it was the time of Yugoslav new wave's heyday, and two of them believed that it was to early for that sort of publication. However, they were prepared to write the encyclopedia of Yugoslav rock in the future, and Janjatović started to collect the material for the future release. At the beginning of the 1990s, at the time of breakup of Yugoslavia, Janjatović started working on the book:

The first edition of the book features biographies and discographies of the acts which gained the attention of the public during the existence of SFR Yugoslavia, including information about their activity after the breakup of the country. From the acts which gained the public's attention after the breakup of Yugoslavia, Janjatović included only artists from FR Yugoslavia (consisting of Serbia and Montenegro). He stated that he believed that the rock scenes of Slovenia, Croatia, Bosnia and Herzegovina and Macedonia were independent scenes with little connection to FR Yugoslav scene.

Ilustrovana ex YU rock enciklopedija 1960 - 2000 (2001)
The second edition of the book, entitled Ilustrovana ex YU rock enciklopedija 1960 - 2000, was published in 2001. In the foreword to the second edition Janjatović states:

As the previous edition, the second edition featured acts from FR Yugoslavia, but not from other SFR Yugoslavia successor states.

Ex YU rock enciklopedija 1960 - 2006 (2007)
The third edition of the book, entitled Ex YU rock enciklopedija 1960 - 2006, was published in 2007. In the foreword, Janjatović states that, thanks to the changed political situation and the Internet, the bonds between scenes of former Yugoslav republics were reestablished. This is one of the reasons he decided to, for the first time, include acts from all former Yugoslav republics into the book. The third edition of the book is divided into three sections: "SFRY", "Serbia" and "The World", "The World" featuring a choice of acts from other former Yugoslav republics, but also the bands formed by former Yugoslav musicians in other countries (like Emir & Frozen Camels and Kultur Shock).

Acts

Yugoslavia (1960 - 1991)

Serbia (1991 - 2006)

"The world" (1991 - 2006)

Reactions and critical reception

First edition
In the first edition, reviews of music critics Petar "Peca" Popović and Ivan Ivačković were published. Popović wrote:

Ivačković wrote:

Milan Vlajčić, in the review published in Serbian newspaper Politika, wrote:

Ivan Marković, in the review published in Bosnian newspaper Oslobođenje, wrote:

Zvezdan Georgijevski, in the review published in Macedonian magazine Puls, wrote:

The book was also praised in reviews in Serbian magazine Vreme, Montenegrin newspaper Vijesti and Bosnian magazine Fan.

There were also negative reactions. A part of Croatian public felt provoked with the fact that Riblja Čorba got more space than any other act in the book, far more than most popular Croatian bands like Parni Valjak and Prljavo Kazalište. In his review, published in Croatian newspaper Večernji list, Darko Glavan wrote:

On the other hand, in the review published in Serbian newspaper Naša Borba, Srđan D. Stojanović wrote:

In the review published in Bosnian magazine Slobodna Bosna, Edin Avdić wrote:

Second edition
Nebojša Grujičić, in the review published in Vreme, wrote:

Third edition
The review published in Serbian newspaper Danas stated:

In the review published on Serbian web magazine Popboks, Dimitrije Vojnov wrote:

The third edition of the book saw some criticism by a part of heavy metal community, because, Janjatović, although including most notable Yugoslav heavy metal acts into the book, did not include pioneers of Yugoslav extreme metal like Heller and Bombarder, and some younger acts that gained large popularity, like Alogia and Kraljevski Apartman.

References 

2007 non-fiction books
Books by Petar Janjatović
Books about rock music
Encyclopedias of music
Yugoslav rock music
Serbian rock music